Cerithiella laevis is a species of very small sea snail, a marine gastropod mollusk in the family Newtoniellidae. .

References

 Engl W. (2012) Shells of Antarctica. Hackenheim: Conchbooks. 402 pp.

Newtoniellidae
Gastropods described in 1982